James Sebe Moroka, OLG (16 March 1891 – 10 November 1985) was a medical doctor and a politician, who was the president of the African National Congress 1949–1952.

Moroka was elected as the president of the ANC by the support of the African National Congress Youth League and its leaders Walter Sisulu and Nelson Mandela in December 1949. During Moroka's presidency, the ANC started to implement more militant tactics in fighting the country's Apartheid regime.

In 1952 Moroka was convicted of "statutory communism" according to the Suppression of Communism Act with 20 other defendants. During the trial Moroka realised the limitations he would have during apartheid while acting as President. He decided he could do more for his community practicing medicine and  pleaded for mitigation and rejected ANC's principles of racial equality and was soon expelled from the party.

The district hospital in Thaba Nchu is named in his memory where he continued to practice medicine. He was a family-oriented Christian.

References

1891 births
1985 deaths
People from Mangaung Metropolitan Municipality
South African Tswana people
Presidents of the African National Congress
Anti-apartheid activists
Members of the Order of Luthuli